Fissore is a surname. Notable people with the surname include:

People
Matías Fissore (born 1990), Argentine footballer
Riccardo Fissore (born 1980), Italian footballer

Companies
Carrozzeria Fissore Italian coachbuilder, founded by Fissore brothers

Italian-language surnames